Iurie Darie (14 March 1929 – 9 November 2012) was a Romanian actor.

Biography
He was born in Vadul-Rașcov, Soroca County, Kingdom of Romania. He studied at the Academy of Theatrical Arts and Cinematography in Bucharest, graduating in 1952. He made his film debut in 1953, playing Miron in The Bugler's Grandsons.

In 2002, Darie received the National Order of Faithful Service with the rank of Knight for his prestigious artistic career.

During his last years Darie suffered from several health problems, including respiratory and cardiac insufficiency and also a stroke. He died on 9 November 2012, aged 83, in Bucharest, surrounded by his family. He was buried in the city's Sfânta Vineri Cemetery.

Partial filmography 
According to IMDB, Iurie Darie featured in 50 films and television series in his six decade-long career.

 The Bugler's Grandsons (1953) - Miron
 The Sun Rises (1954) - Miron
 Directorul nostru (1955)
  (1955)
 Alarm in the Mountains (1955) - Grigore
  (1956) - Dinu
  (1958) - studentul Victor Mancaș
  (1960) - Dinu Almajan
 A Bomb Was Stolen (1962) - Om
  (1962) - Puiu Crintea
 Vacanța la mare (1963) - Stadion
 Pisica de mare (1964) - Radu
 Dragoste la Zero Grade (1964) - Andrei
 Mofturi 1900 (1964)
 Calea Victoriei sau cheia visurilor (1965) - Mirel Alcaz
 Procesul alb (1966) - Matei
 Faust XX (1966) - 
 The Subterranean (1967) - Mircea Tudoran
 A Woman for a Season (1969) - Filip Palaloga
  (1970) - Oto Horst
 Brigada Diverse intrã în acțiune (1970) - Maiorul Dobrescu
 Signale - Ein Weltraumabenteuer (1970) - Commander
 B.D. în alertă - Profesorul de mimică (1970) - Maiorul Dobrescu
 Osceola (1971) - Richard Moore
 Brigada Diverse în alertă! (1971) - Major Dobrescu
 B.D. la munte și la mare (1971) - Major Dobrescu
 B.D. în alerta - Văduve cu termen redus (1971) - Maiorul Dobrescu
 Then I Sentenced Them All to Death (1972) - 
 Cantemir (1973) - Mihuț Gălățeanu / Miguel São Miguel
 Frații Jderi (1974) - Simion Jder
 Ștefan cel Mare - Vaslui 1475 (1975) - Nobleman Simion Jder
 Blood Brothers (1975) - Bill Simmons
 Muschetarul român (1975) - Colonel Mihuț Gălățeanu / Captain Miguel São Miguel
 Serenada pentru etajul XII (1976) - Off Duty Cop
 Misterul lui Herodot (1976)
 Pentru patrie (1977) - Major Gheorghe Sontu
  (1977) - Sigismund Báthory
 Severino (1978)
 Revanșa (1978)
 Cianura și picatura de ploaie (1978) - Robert Rădulescu
 Ein April hat 30 Tage (1979) - Alvaro
 Am fost 16 (1979) - Major Marinescu
 Drumul oaselor (1980) - Boier Pană
 Sing, Cowboy, sing (1981) - Dave Arnold
 Viraj periculos (1983) - Lt. col. Mihai Mihnea
 The Ring (1984) - 
 Rămășagul (1984) - Thief
 Galax, omul păpușă (1984) - Professor
 Cucoana Chirița (1986)
 Cale liberă (1986)
 În fiecare zi mi-e dor de tine (1988) - The Director
 Moara (1990) 
 Oglinda (1994) - General Constantin Sănătescu
 Triunghiul morții (1999)
 Numai iubirea (2004, TV Series) - Nichifor Dogaru (final appearance)

References

1929 births
2012 deaths
People from Șoldănești District
Romanian male film actors
Romanian people of Moldovan descent
Recipients of the National Order of Faithful Service
Caragiale National University of Theatre and Film alumni